Xylotopus is a genus of midges in the family Chironomidae. There are at least two described species in Xylotopus.

Species
These two species belong to the genus Xylotopus:
 Xylotopus burmanesis Oliver, 1985
 Xylotopus par (Coquiletti, 1901)

References

Further reading

 
 

Nematocera genera
Articles created by Qbugbot